The Symphoniker Hamburg (Hamburg Symphony Orchestra) is a German orchestra based in Hamburg, Germany.  Founded in 1957, it is one of the city's three largest orchestras.  The Hamburg Symphony Orchestra is the orchestra in residence in the Laeiszhalle, the Hamburg Music Hall.  In addition to symphony concerts, the Hamburg Symphony regularly performs as accompanying ensembles for operas and ballets at the Hamburg State Opera House.  The orchestra also offers subscription series of children's concerts, and annual open-air concerts held in the central courtyard of Hamburg's town hall.

History
The Hamburg Symphony Orchestra gave its first concert on 16 October 1957 under the direction of its first chief conductor, Robert Heger. Heger served in the post until 1961.  His successors included Heribert Beissel, who has held the longest tenure as chief conductor to date from 1972–1986, Carlos Kalmar (1987–1991), Miguel Gómez-Martinez (1992–1999), and Yoav Talmi (2000–2004).  Principal guest conductors have included István Kertész.  

Andrey Boreyko was principal conductor from 2004 until his sudden resignation in the autumn of 2007.  Jeffrey Tate was appointed chief conductor in October 2007 and took up the post in the spring of 2008.  In February 2014, the orchestra announced the extension of Tate's contract as chief conductor through 2019.  Tate held the Hamburg chief conductorship until his death on 2 June 2017.

In February 2018, the orchestra announced the appointment of Sylvain Cambreling as its next chief conductor, effective with the 2018–2019 season.  In June 2022, the orchestra announced the extension of Cambreling's contract through the summer of 2028.

Recordings with the Hamburg Symphony Orchestra have appeared on Dabringshaus und Grimm, edel classics and Deutsche Grammophon (Deutscher Schallplattenpreis ECHO Klassik).

Chief conductors
 Robert Heger (1957–1961)
 Gabor Ötvös (1961–1967)
 Wilfried Boettcher (1967–1971)
 Heribert Beissel (1972–1986)
 Carlos Kalmar (1987–1991)
 Miguel Gómez-Martínez (1992–1999)
 Yoav Talmi (2000–2004)
 Andrey Boreyko (2004–2007)
 Sir Jeffrey Tate (2009–2017)
 Sylvain Cambreling (2018–present)

References

External links 
 Official website of the Hamburger Symphoniker

Culture in Hamburg
German symphony orchestras
Musical groups established in 1957
Musical groups from Hamburg
Tourist attractions in Hamburg
1957 establishments in West Germany